Tasos Zembylas (born 1962 in Cyprus) is a philosopher and social scientist with focus in aesthetics and cultural institution studies.

Life 

From 1991 to 1997, Zembylas studied philosophy, history of art and sociology at the University of Vienna. In 1995 he held a research grant at the "Internationales Forschungszentrum Kulturwissenschaften" in Vienna. From 1997 to 1999 he was commissioned to carry out various studies in the field of education and vocational training. He also lectured on aesthetics and sociology of art at the University of Vienna and at the University of Applied Art in Vienna. In 1999, he was appointed assistant professor at the Institute of Culture Management and Culture Studies of the University of Music and Performing Arts Vienna. Having completed his advanced habilitation thesis in 2003, he was appointed university professor for Cultural Institutions Studies at the same institute. In 2009, Zembylas was visiting professor at Zeppelin University in Friedrichshafen, and 2010 he moved to the Institute for Music Sociology at the University of Music and Performing Arts Vienna.

Research 

Major research interests of Tasos Zembylas are epistemology of artistic creative practices, Cultural Institutions Studies, and cultural policy.
In the 1990s Tasos Zembylas investigated the formation process of the contemporary concept of art. His approach was to study not only relevant discourses and art theories in visual arts, but, equally important, to describe and analyse institutional structures, processes of valuations and other practices taking place in the art world. He thereby developed a practice-oriented and practice-theoretical approach to the sociology of the arts.
The close connection between arts and social practices, as well as between art worlds and social structures embodied in cultural activities, led Zembylas in early 2000s to focus on cultural, social, political and economic analysis of arts and culture. His theoretical efforts resulted in the elaboration of an inter-disciplinary approach towards the major topics of cultural institution studies. In addition to his theoretical work, Zembylas has conducted several empirical studies, notably on public funding of the arts in Austria, which dealt with the legal standards prevailing in administrative subsidy procedures as well as the effects of public funding policies.
From 2006 to 2008, together with Claudia Dürr, Zembylas investigated the literary writing process from an epistemological perspective. The study focused on the formation and effects of artistic-practical know-how, as well as on the role of professional experience in the creative process. This study led to a general epistemology of artistic creative practices.
From 2013 to 2015, together with Andreas Holzer, Annegret Huber, Martin Niederauer and Rosa Reitsamer, Zembylas conducted a similar study on composition processes in the field of contemporary art music. In this case, the focus was on the materiality and processuality of artistic practices. In addition, the synergy of different forms of knowledge (especially tacit knowledge) was systematically investigated.
Tasos Zembylas has also published a literary travelogue about Athos. In it he not only addressed religious practices but also the economic management of the Holy Monastery of Vatopedi, which made the headlines in the international press in 2008 in connection with a real estate scandal.

References 

On Sociology of art:

 Kunst oder Nichtkunst. Über die Bedingungen und Instanzen ästhetischer Beurteilung, (Art and Non-Art. Conditions and Authorities of Aesthetic Valuation), Vienna: Facultas, 1997
 (Editor) Kurt Blaukopf on Music Sociology – an Anthology, Frankfurt am Main: Peter Lang Verlag, 2012
 (Editor) Artistic Practices. Social Interactions and Cultural Dynamics, London: Routledge, 2014

On Philosophy of art:

 Das Subjekt in der Malerei. Anatomie eines sterbenden Mythos, (The Subject in Painting. Anatomy of a Myth), Innsbruck: StudienVerlag, 2000

On Cultural policy:

 (Editor), Kunst und Politik – Aspekte einer Problematik, (Arts and Politics – Some Problematic Issues), Innsbruck: StudienVerlag, 2000
 (First Editor) Der Staat als kulturfördernde Instanz, (The State as a Culture Funding Authority), Innsbruck: StudienVerlag, 2005
 (Co-Editor) The Journal of Arts Management Law and Society, Arts Management. A Sociological Inquiry, Vol. 40, Nr. 1, 2010
 (Co-Editor) Kulturmanagement and Kulturpolitik. Jahrbuch für Kulturmanagement 2011, (Cultural Management and Cultural Policy), Bielefeld: Transcript, 2011

On Cultural Institutions Studies:

 Kulturbetriebslehre – Grundlagen einer Inter-Disziplin, (Cultural Institutions Studies – Foundations of an Interdisciplinary Approach), Wiesbaden: Verlag für Sozialwissenschaften, 2004
 (First Editor) Kulturbetriebsforschung – Methoden und Perspektiven, (Research on Cultural Sector – Methods and Perspectives) Wiesbaden: Verlag für Sozialwissenschaften, 2006

On Epistemology of Creative Processes:

 (together with Martin Niederauer), Composing Processes and Artistic Agency: Tacit Knowledge in Composing, London: Routledge, 2017
 (together with Martin Niederauer), Praktiken des Komponierens. Soziologische, wissenstheoretische und musikwissenschaftliche Perspektiven, Wiesbaden: Springer-VS, 2016
 (together with Claudia Dürr), Wissen, Können und literarisches Schreiben. Eine Epistemologie der künstlerischen Praxis, (Knowledge, Knowing and Literary Writing. An Epistemology of Artistic Practice), Vienna: Passagen Verlag, 2009.

Other topics:

 Die Mönchsrepublik Athos. Eine geistige Gesellschaft mit beschränkter Haftung, (The Monks Republic Athos. A Spiritual Corporation), Vienna: Passagen Verlag, 2010

External links 
 http://personal.mdw.ac.at/zembylas/
 http://www.mdw.ac.at/ims/

Philosophers of art
20th-century philosophers
21st-century philosophers
Living people
1962 births